The America Zone was one of the three regional zones of the 1953 Davis Cup.

6 teams entered the America Zone, with the winner going on to compete in the Inter-Zonal Zone against the winners of the Eastern Zone and Europe Zone. The United States defeated Canada in the final and progressed to the Inter-Zonal Zone.

Draw

Quarterfinals

United States vs. Japan

Canada vs. Mexico

Semifinals

Caribbean/West Indies vs. United States

Canada vs. Cuba

Final

Canada vs. United States

References

External links
Davis Cup official website

Davis Cup Americas Zone
America Zone
Davis Cup